Daffodil International University (DIU) is a private research university located in Daffodil Smart City, Ashulia, Dhaka, Bangladesh. It was established on 24 January 2002 under the Private University Act of 1992 which was replaced by Private University Act 2010. 

The 2023 QS Asian University Rankings placed DIU between 351st and 400th among Asian universities and 5th among Bangladeshi universities. DIU has been ranked within the top 400 universities in the Times Higher Education Impact Rankings 2022. DIU is the first university in Bangladesh to have signed the UN's Commitment to Sustainable Practices of Higher Education Institutions. According to the SCOPUS indexed research publications in 2022, Daffodil International University has been positioned 2nd among all universities and 1st among all private universities in Bangladesh.

History 
The university was established on 24 January 2002 with the approval of the University Grants Commission (Bangladesh) and the Government of Bangladesh's Ministry of Education under the Private University Act of 1992 which was replaced by Private University Act 2010.

Campuses 
The campus is located in Daffodil Smart City, Ashulia, Dhaka, Bangladesh. The university campus covers about 300 acres of land. Facilities include a hostel, golf course, and shopping mall.

List of vice chancellors 
 Aminul Islam (2002–2011)
 M. Lutfar Rahman (2011–2015)
 Yousuf Mahbubul Islam (2015–2020)
 M. Lutfar Rahman (2020–present)

Faculties and departments 
The university offers bachelor's, master's and doctoral degrees through its 23 departments, themselves organized into 5 faculties:

1. Faculty of Science & Information Technology  
 Department of Software Engineering (SWE)
 Department of Computer Science and Engineering (CSE)
 Department of Multimedia and Creative Technology (MCT)
 Department of Information Technology and Management (ITM)
 Department of Computing and Information System (CIS)
 Department of General Educational Development (GED)
 Department of Environmental Science and Disaster Management (ESDM)
 Department of Physical Education & Sports Science (PESS)

2. Faculty of Engineering  
 Department of Electrical and Electronic Engineering (EEE)
 Department of Information and communication Engineering (ICE)
 Department of Electronics and Telecommunication Engineering (ETE)
 Department of Textile Engineering (TE)
 Department of Architecture 
 Department of Civil Engineering (CE)

3. Faculty of Business & Entrepreneurship 
 Department of Business Administration (BBA)
 Department of Real Estate (RE)
 Department of Tourism & Hospitality Management (THM)
 Department of Innovation and Entrepreneurship (I&E)
 Department of Business Studies (BBS)

4. Faculty of Humanities & Social Science  
 Department of English
 Department of Law
 Department of Journalism & Mass Communication (JMC)
 Department of Development Studies (DS)
 Department of Information Science and Library Management

5. Faculty of Allied Health Science  
 Department of Pharmacy
 Department of Nutrition and Food Engineering (NFE)
 Department of Public Health (PH)

Institutes 

 Daffodil Institute of Languages (DIL)
 Human Resource Development Institute (HRDI) 
 Enterprise Competitiveness Institute (ECI)
 Daffodil Institute of Social Sciences (DISS)
 Institutional Quality Assurance Cell (IQAC)
 Directorate of Students' Affairs (Institute)

Centers
 Division of Research
 Yunus Social Business Centre (YSBC)
 Innovation and Incubation Centre (IIC)
 Career Development Centre (CDC)
 Cyber Security Center (CSC)
 Daffodil Islamic Center
 Daffodil Legal Research Center (DLRC)
 DIU Medical Center
 Day Care Center
 DIU Business Incubator
 DIU BELT & Road Research Centre

Grading system in DIU

Convocation 

 10th Convocation - 9 February 2023
 9th Convocation - 9 January 2022
8th Convocation - 13 March 2019
 7th Convocation - 10 January 2018
 6th Convocation - 22 February 2017
 5th Convocation - 13 December 2016
 4th Convocation - 4 March 2014
 3rd Convocation - 26 February 2012
 2nd Convocation - 26 May 2008
 1st Convocation - 24 May  2006

Rankings and awards 
 As per QS University Rankings: Asia 2023, DIU placed within the top 400 Asian universities. 
DIU ranked within the top 400 universities in the Times Higher Education Impact Rankings 2022.
DIU is the top private University in Bangladesh as per Scopus Indexed Publications in 2022
DIU Ranked 1st in Bangladesh and 191st in UI Greenmetric World University Rankings 2022
DIU Ranked top in Bangladesh & 150th globally at UI Greenmetric World University Rankings, 2019
CSIC 5th-ranked university in Bangladesh
 One of the top ranked universities in Bangladesh by 4ICU (2022)
 Membership, International Association of Universities (2013)
DIU Achieved the ASOCIO ICT Education Award 2018
Wins “Global Inclusion Award 2017”
DIU Won the "GEN ROOKIE of the Year" Award-2019
DIU awarded WITSA Global ICT Excellence Award 2017

D. Litt. conferred by DIU 

Daffodil International University authority conferred the D.Litt. Honoris Causa on philanthropist and entrepreneur Achyuta Samanta in DIU's 4th Convocation on 6 March 2014.

Notable faculty
 Syed Akhter Hossain, the head of the Department of Computer Science and Engineering, received the National ICT Award 2016 for his "excellent contribution in ICT Education and Technology".
 Bibhuti Roy, visiting professor at the Department of Computer Science and Engineering.

References

External links 

 
 DIU library

Private universities in Bangladesh
Educational institutions established in 2002
2002 establishments in Bangladesh
Universities and colleges in Dhaka